Matías Sebastián Villavicencio (born 18 September 1981 in Buenos Aires) is an Argentine football defender who currently plays for San Martín Tucumán in the Torneo Argentino A.

Villavicencio made his professional debut on 7 December 2001 in a 1-0 victory over Nueva Chicago. In 2002, he was part of the squad that won the Apertura 2002 championship.

In 2004 Villavicencio joined Huracán of the 2nd division. The following year he returned to the Primera when he joined Olimpo de Bahía Blanca  the club were relegated in 2006 but they won promotion by winning the Apertura 2006 and Clausura 2007 back to back.

In 2008 after his second relegation with Olimpo he joined newly promoted San Martín de Tucumán who were relegated at the end of the season. Villavicencio again left the relegated team to join another newly promoted club, this time San Martín's local rivals Atlético Tucumán.

On July 29, 2010, Villavicencio signed a 1-year contract with Chinese Super League side Shanghai Shenhua F.C.

Titles

References

External links
 Player profile on official Shanghai Shenhua site
Guardian statistics
 BDFA profile
 Argentine Primera statistics

1981 births
Living people
Footballers from Buenos Aires
Argentine footballers
Association football defenders
Club Atlético Independiente footballers
Club Atlético Huracán footballers
Olimpo footballers
San Martín de Tucumán footballers
Atlético Tucumán footballers
Shanghai Shenhua F.C. players
Ferro Carril Oeste footballers
Argentine Primera División players
Argentine expatriate footballers
Expatriate footballers in China
Chinese Super League players
Primera Nacional players